Findlay (Finlay) George MacDiarmid (October 11, 1869 – July 15, 1933) was an Ontario farmer and political figure. He represented Elgin West in the Legislative Assembly of Ontario as a Conservative member in 1898 and from 1900 to 1919 and from 1923 to 1929.

He was born in New Glasgow, Aldborough Township, Elgin County, Ontario, the son of Finlay MacDiarmid. He served on the township council for Aldborough Township. In 1895, he married Minnie McGugan. In the 1898 election, he was declared defeated but then was declared elected on appeal. That election was then voided and he lost the by-election that followed in 1899 to Donald Macnish. After another appeal, MacDiarmid won a by-election held in 1900. He served as Minister of Public Works and Highways from 1914 to 1919, Minister of Public Highways from 1916 to 1919, and Minister of Labour (although Walter Rollo is credited as first Minister of Labour after 1919 elections) from February to November 1919.

He died from a stroke at Toronto General Hospital on July 15, 1933.

References 

 Canadian Parliamentary Guide, 1901, AJ Magurn

External links 

1869 births
1933 deaths
Progressive Conservative Party of Ontario MPPs